Biomedical Systems Corporation was a global company specializing in clinical trials services and medical devices to biopharmaceutical and healthcare organizations.

History
Founded in 1975, Biomedical Systems offered centralized cardiac safety, medical imaging and respiratory services in drug development and also collected, analyzed and distributed electronic patient-reported outcome (ePRO) in multiple modalities across all phases of clinical research.

In 2010 Biomedical Systems introduced their own Wireless Ambulatory ECG Monitoring System called the TruVue™ Wireless Telemetry Device as part of their Cardiac Patient Services Business. TruVue would record and remotely transmit heartbeats for up to 30 days; and was intended for the diagnosis and management of atrial fibrillation and other cardiac arrhythmia. Biomedical Systems later sold TruVue to Malvern, Pennsylvania-based BioTelemetry, Inc. for $8.65 million.

Later in 2012 Biomedical Systems added ePRO services through their acquisition of Belgium-based Symfo.

On September 8, 2017, ERT announced its acquisition of Biomedical Systems.

Locations
 Maryland Heights, Missouri (global headquarters)
 Brussels, Belgium (European headquarters, established in 1981)
 Tsukuba, Japan
 Pondicherry, India
 Beijing, China (partnership)

References 

Medical technology companies of the United States
Companies based in St. Louis
Health care companies established in 1975
Electrodiagnosis
Medical imaging
Clinical data management
1975 establishments in Missouri
Technology companies disestablished in 2017
2017 mergers and acquisitions
2017 disestablishments in Missouri